Upper Nile University (UNU) is a university in South Sudan.

Location
The university's main campus is located in the town of Malakal, Upper Nile State, on the banks of the White Nile. The coordinates of the main university campus are: 9 33 00N, 31 39 30E (Latitude: 9.5508; Longitude: 31.6600).

Overview
Upper Nile University is one of the five public universities in South Sudan. The list includes the following institutions:

 University of Juba  in Juba
 Rumbek University of Science and Technology  in Rumbek
 University of Bahr El-Ghazal in Wau
 Upper Nile University in Malakal
 John Garang Memorial University  in Bor 

NB:
University of Northern Bahr El-Ghazal in Aweil, Not yet established, not yet constructed, and not yet opened.

History
Upper Nile University was founded in 1991. Due to the Second Sudanese Civil War, some of the university faculties were relocated to Khartoum, Sudan, for the safety of staff, students and infrastructure. Following South Sudan's independence in July 2011, the university is consolidating all activities to its main campus in the city of Malakal, Upper Nile State, in South Sudan's northeast.

Academics
, the university maintains the following faculties:

 Faculty of Agriculture
 Faculty of Animal Production
 Faculty of Arts & Humanities
 Faculty of Computer Science
 Faculty of Education
 Faculty of Forestry
 Faculty of Medicine & Public Health 
 Faculty of Nursing
 Faculty of Science
 Faculty of Social Science
 Faculty of Veterinary Medicine
 Faculty of Vocational Education

See also
Malakal
Upper Nile (state)
Greater Upper Nile
Education in South Sudan
List of universities in South Sudan

References

External links
Location of Upper Nile University Campus At Google Maps
UNU Consolidating All Faculties In Malakal

Universities in South Sudan
Educational organisations based in South Sudan
Upper Nile (state)
Greater Upper Nile
Educational institutions established in 1991
1991 establishments in Sudan